Burnt Weeny Sandwich is the sixth studio album by the American rock band the Mothers of Invention, and the ninth overall by Frank Zappa, released in 1970. It consists of both studio recordings and live elements. In contrast to the next album Weasels Ripped My Flesh, which is predominantly live and song-oriented, most of Burnt Weeny Sandwich focuses on studio recordings and tightly arranged compositions.

The LP included a large triple-folded black and white poster ("The Mothers of Invention Sincerely Regret to Inform You") which has never been reproduced in any of the CD reissues (except the Japanese Ryko mini-lp sleeve editions).

Title 
The album's unusual title, Zappa would later say in an interview, comes from an actual snack that he enjoyed eating, consisting of a burnt Hebrew National hot dog sandwiched between two pieces of bread with mustard.

Burnt Weeny Sandwich and Weasels Ripped My Flesh were also reissued together on vinyl as 2 Originals of the Mothers of Invention, with the original covers used as the left and right sides of the inner spread, and the front cover depicting a revolver shooting toothpaste onto a toothbrush.

Album information 
The album was essentially a 'posthumous' Mothers release having been released after Frank Zappa dissolved the band.

Ian Underwood's contributions are significant on this album. Like its counterpart Weasels Ripped My Flesh, this comprises tracks from the Mothers vault that were not previously released. Whereas Weasels mostly showcases the Mothers in a live setting, much of Burnt Weeny Sandwich features studio work and structured Zappa compositions, like the centerpiece of the album, "Little House I Used to Live In", which consists of several movements and employs compound meters such as 11/8 with overlaid melodies in 6/8 and 4/4. The ending section of "Little House" features an organ solo played by Zappa with the band at Whitney Studios in Glendale, California.

The guitar solo portion of the "Theme from Burnt Weeny Sandwich" is an outtake from an unused extended version of "Lonely Little Girl" from the 1967 sessions for the We're Only in It for the Money LP. Zappa and Art Tripp later added multiple percussion overdubs for the released version (The source recordings for the percussion overdubs were issued in 2012 on the posthumous Zappa release Finer Moments under the title "Enigmas 1-5").

"Valarie" was originally intended to be released as a single coupled with "My Guitar Wants to Kill Your Mama". However, either Zappa or his distributor, Reprise Records, cancelled its release, resulting in its  inclusion on the LP.

"Igor's Boogie" is a reference to a major Zappa influence, composer Igor Stravinsky.

Cal Schenkel has noted that his unique cover art for Burnt Weeny Sandwich was originally commissioned for the cover of an Eric Dolphy release.

The piano introduction of "Little House I Used to Live in" appears in Yvar Mikhashoff's four CD set "Yvar Mikhashoff's Panorama of American Piano Music".

Track listing

Personnel 
 Frank Zappa – guitar, organ, vocals
 Jimmy Carl Black – percussion, drums
 Roy Estrada – bass, backing vocals, Pachuco rap on "WPLJ"
 Janet Ferguson – backing vocals on "WPLJ"
 Bunk Gardner – wind
 Buzz Gardner - trumpet
 Billy Mundi – drums (uncredited, left group in December 1967, pictured on gatefold cover and possibly played on "Theme from Burnt Weeny Sandwich")
 Lowell George – guitar, vocals
 Don "Sugarcane" Harris – violin on "Little House I Used to Live In"
 Don Preston – piano, keyboards
 Jim Sherwood – wind
 Art Tripp – drums, percussion
 Ian Underwood – piano, keyboards, wind
 John Balkin – bass on "WPLJ", string bass on "Overture to a Holiday in Berlin"

Production 
 Producer: Frank Zappa
 Engineer: Dick Kunc
 Arranger: Frank Zappa
 Design: John Williams
 Cover art: Cal Schenkel
 CD package design: Ferenc Dobronyl
 CD art adaptation: Cal Schenkel

Charts 
Album - Billboard (United States)

References 

1970 albums
Albums produced by Frank Zappa
Bizarre Records albums
Frank Zappa albums
Reprise Records albums
The Mothers of Invention albums